Cynthia R. Sung is an American roboticist known for her research on foldable robots. She is Gabel Family Term Assistant Professor of Mechanical Engineering & Applied Mechanics, with a secondary appointment in the Department of Computer and Information Science, at the University of Pennsylvania.

Early life and education
Sung learned origami from her mother as a child, and became interested in robotics as a high school student after following the explorations of the Mars rovers Opportunity and Spirit. She studied mechanical engineering at Rice University, graduating in 2011, and completed her Ph.D. in 2016 at the Massachusetts Institute of Technology (MIT). Her dissertation, Computational Design of Foldable Robots via Composition, was supervised by Daniela L. Rus.

Contributions and recognition
As a student at MIT, Sung led a team developing the Robogami system, making it easy for beginners to design and 3D print robots by putting them together from flat parts folded at hinged connections, and she continues to develop the system after moving to the university of Pennsylvania, incorporating improved motion and control capabilities into the system.

She has developed a technique of "additive self-folding", in which robots are initially created as long flat strips of a self-folding material, which arranges itself into the desired shape of a robot when placed into hot water. For her work in this area, Popular Mechanics gave her one of their 2017 Breakthrough Awards.

In 2017, the American Society of Mechanical Engineers named Sung to represent the society in the New Faces of Engineering program. Sung was the 2020 winner of the Johnson & Johnson Women in STEM2D Scholars Award in Manufacturing, for her work in foldable robotics and their applications in healthcare and medicine. She and her coauthors won the IEEE ICRA Best Paper Award on Mechanisms and Design for their work on aerial vehicles with foldable wings that can reshape themselves for both fixed-wing and quadrotor flight.

References

External links
Sung Robotics Lab

Year of birth missing (living people)
Living people
American roboticists
Women roboticists
American mechanical engineers
American women engineers
Rice University alumni
Massachusetts Institute of Technology alumni
University of Pennsylvania faculty
21st-century American women